A codebreaker is a person who performs cryptanalysis.

Codebreaker or Code breaker may also refer to:
 The Codebreakers, a 1967 book on history of cryptography by David Kahn
 Code:Breaker, a 2008 manga by Akimine Kamijyo
 Code Breakers (film), a 2005 American TV film about West Point
 The Code-Breakers, a 2006 British documentary film about software
 Codebreaker (film), a 2011 British film about Alan Turing
 Code Breaker, a video game cheat device
 Codebreaker (video game), an Atari 2600 video game
 Codebreaker or double knee facebreaker, a wrestling move
 The Codebreaker, an episode of the television documentary series American Experience about the life of cryptanalyst Elizebeth Smith Friedman 
 The Code Breaker, a 2021 book by Walter Isaacson

See also 
 Code talker, a wartime language speaker
 Signals intelligence